Calliotropis hataii is a species of sea snail, a marine gastropod mollusk in the family Eucyclidae.

Description
The length of the shell reaches 10 mm.

Distribution
This marine species is found on the Mid-Pacific seamounts and off Wallis and Futuna.

References

 Rehder H. A. & Ladd H. S. (1973) Deep and shallow-water mollusks from the Central Pacific. Science Reports of the Tohoku University, Sendai, ser. 2 (Geology) Special vol. 6 (Hatai Memorial Volume): 37–49, pl. 3. page(s): 43
 Vilvens C. (2007) New records and new species of Calliotropis from Indo-Pacific. Novapex 8 (Hors Série 5): 1–72.

External links
 

hataii
Gastropods described in 1973